Lumbrineris latreilli is an annelid discovered by Jean Victoire Audouin and Henri Milne-Edwards in 1834.

In appearance they are iridescent; orange, pale pink or brown from different angles. They grow up to 300 cm and live mostly in muddy fine sand.

They are a marine species and are found worldwide in temperate waters.

References

Errantia
Animals described in 1834
Taxa named by Henri Milne-Edwards
Taxa named by Jean Victoire Audouin
Articles containing video clips